Paracephaelis is a genus of flowering plants belonging to the family Rubiaceae.

Its native range is Kenya to Mozambique and the Western Indian Ocean. It is found in Aldabra, Comoros, Kenya, Madagascar, Mozambique and Tanzania.

It is now listed as Extinct in Réunion.

Species
According to Kew:
Paracephaelis cinerea 
Paracephaelis saxatilis 
Paracephaelis sericea 
Paracephaelis tiliacea 
Paracephaelis trichantha

References

Rubiaceae
Rubiaceae genera
Flora of the Western Indian Ocean
Flora of Kenya
Flora of Mozambique
Flora of Tanzania